Humboldt Transit Authority (HTA) operates several transit services in Humboldt County, California:
Redwood Transit System
Eureka Transit Service
Willow Creek Intercity
Arcata & Mad River Transit System
Blue Lake Rancheria Transit System
Paratransit/Dial-A-Ride

External links 
 Humboldt Transit Authority

Bus transportation in California
Eureka, California
Public transportation in Humboldt County, California
Transit agencies in California